Tomás Eduardo Tovar Rascón (May 24, 1981 – May 29, 2014), also known by his alias Tito Torbellino, was an American singer known for his work with the Regional Mexican music genre. He was from Phoenix, Arizona.

Tovar was murdered as he dined at El Red Restaurant Ciudad Obregón, Mexico, on May 29, 2014, five days after his 33rd birthday. Until this day the murder is still under investigation.

See also 
List of unsolved murders

References 

1981 births
2014 deaths
American banda musicians
American male singers
American musicians of Mexican descent
American people murdered abroad
Male murder victims
Musicians from Phoenix, Arizona
People murdered in Mexico
Unsolved murders in Mexico